Korchagin is a Russian masculine surname, its feminine counterpart is Korchagina. It may refer to:

Andrei Korchagin (born 1980), Russian football player
Erik Korchagin (born 1979), Russian football player
Ivan Korchagin (1898–1951), Soviet general
Lioudmila Kortchguina (born 1971), Canadian marathon runner
Pavel Korchagin, central character of the novel How the Steel Was Tempered
Sergei Korchagin (born 1975), Russian football player
Viktor Korchagin (born 1967), Russian ski-orienteering competitor

See also
Yuri Korchagin field, an offshore oil field in the Russian sector of the Caspian Sea

Russian-language surnames